Shahrak-e Emam Reza (also Romanized as Shahrak-e Emām Reẕā; also known as Dobendār, Do Bondār, Dubandar, and Dūbendār) is a village in Howmeh Rural District, in the Central District of Andimeshk County, Khuzestan Province, Iran. At the 2006 census, its population was 528, in 125 families.

References 

Populated places in Andimeshk County